Truman is a 1995 American biographical drama television film directed by Frank Pierson and written by Thomas Rickman, based on David McCullough's Pulitzer Prize-winning 1992 book, Truman. Starring Gary Sinise as Harry S. Truman, the film centers on Truman's humble beginnings, his rise to the presidency, World War II, and his decision to use the first atomic bomb. The film's tagline is "It took a farmer's hand to shape a nation."

Cast
 Gary Sinise as Harry S. Truman
 Diana Scarwid as Bess Truman
 Richard Dysart as Henry L. Stimson
 Colm Feore as Charlie Ross
 James Gammon as Sam Rayburn
 Tony Goldwyn as Clark Clifford
 Pat Hingle as  Boss Tom Pendergast
 Harris Yulin as General George C. Marshall
 Leo Burmester as Frank Vassar
 Amelia Campbell as Margaret Truman
 Virginia Capers as Elizabeth Moore
 John Finn as Bob Hannegan
 Željko Ivanek as Eddie Jacobson
 David Lansbury as Lt. Jim Pendergast
 Remak Ramsay as Dean Acheson
 Marian Seldes as Eleanor Roosevelt
 Lois Smith as Madge Wallace Gates
 Richard Venture as J. Lester Perry
 Daniel von Bargen as General Douglas MacArthur
 Michael Murphy as Dinner Speaker

Reception
On Rotten Tomatoes, the film has an 88% rating based on reviews from 8 critics. Steve Crum of the Dispatch-Tribune Newspapers rated it 5 out of 5, calling it a "Superb production with memorable Sinise performance in title role." TV Guide said, "Over-applauded by many critics, Truman is sturdy, standardized biographical moviemaking elevated by incontestably brilliant acting. Unfortunately, this cavalcade of facts and figures is conceived and executed impersonally like a docent delivering a speech in front of the waxworks at a Presidential museum. … [The audience lacks] a sense that Truman's travails have been shaped on screen by a filmmaker's passion. … Truman offers the satisfaction of textual thoroughness and seamless storytelling, but few flashes of inspiration or imagination."

Accolades
1996 American Cinema Editors (Eddies)
 Nominated – Best Edited Motion Picture for Non-Commercial Television — Lisa Fruchtman
1996 American Society of Cinematographers
 Won – Outstanding Achievement in Cinematography in a Special or Pilots — Paul Elliot
1996 Casting Society of America (Artios)
 Won – Best Casting for TV Movie of the Week —  Mary Colquhoun 
1996 Directors Guild of America
 Nominated – Outstanding Directorial Achievement in Dramatic Specials — Frank Pierson
1996 Emmy Awards
 Won – Outstanding Casting for a Miniseries, Movie, or a Special — Mary Colquhoun
 Won – Outstanding Made for Television Movie — Paula Weinstein, Anthea Sylbert, Doro Bachrach
 Nominated – Outstanding Lead Actor in a Miniseries or a Movie — Gary Sinise
 Nominated – Outstanding Supporting Actress in a Miniseries or a Movie — Diana Scarwid
 Nominated – Outstanding Editing For A Miniseries Or A Movie (Single-Camera Picture) — Lisa Fruchtman
 Nominated – Outstanding Makeup For A Miniseries, Movie Or A Special — Ashlee Petersen, Gordon J. Smith, Russel Cate, Evan Penny
 Nominated – Outstanding Sound Mixing For A Miniseries or a Movie — Reinhard Stergar, Wayne Heitman, James Bolt, Joel Fein
 Nominated – Outstanding Writing for a Miniseries or a Special — Thomas Rickman
1996 Golden Globe Awards
 Won – Best Actor – Series, Mini-series or Motion Picture Made for Television — Gary Sinise
 Nominated – Best Mini-series or Motion Picture Made for Television
1996 PGA Golden Laurel Awards
 Won – Television Producer of the Year Award in Longform — Paula Weinstein, Anthea Sylbert, Doro Bachrach
1996 Screen Actors Guild Awards
 Won – Outstanding Performance by a Male Actor in a TV Movie or Miniseries — Gary Sinise

References

External links
 
 

1995 television films
1995 films
1995 drama films
1990s biographical drama films
1990s English-language films
1990s political drama films
American biographical drama films
American political drama films
Films about Harry Truman
Biographical television films
Cultural depictions of Douglas MacArthur
Cultural depictions of Eleanor Roosevelt
Cultural depictions of Harry S. Truman
American drama television films
Films about presidents of the United States
Films based on biographies
Films set in Missouri
Films shot in Kansas
Films shot in Missouri
Films directed by Frank Pierson
Films scored by David Mansfield
HBO Films films
Primetime Emmy Award for Outstanding Made for Television Movie winners
Television films based on books
1990s American films